The 2014 Oceania Junior Athletics Championships were held at the BCI Stadium in Avarua, Rarotonga, Cook Islands, between June 24–26, 2014.  They were held together with the 2014 Oceania Senior Championships, and there were also exhibition events for masters, and athletes with a disability (parasports).  Detailed reports on a day by day basis were given.

In the junior category, a total of 41 events were contested, 20 by men and 21 by women.

Medal summary
Complete results can be found on the Oceania Athletics Association webpage.

Boys (U20)

Girls (U20)

Medal table (unofficial)

Participation
According to an unofficial count, 140 athletes from 21 countries participated.  As in the years before, there was also a "Regional Australia Team" (dubbed "RAT" in the results list) recruited by Athletics North Queensland and Athletics Northern Territory.  Moreover, there was an athlete (Australian Cedric Dubler) representing the IAAF High-Performance Training Centre (HPTC) in Varsity Lakes, Queensland, Australia.  Some athletes competed in both the junior and the senior category.

 (2)
 (36)
 Australia HPTC (1)
 (16)
 (3)
 (9)
 (8)
 (2)
 (4)
 (1)
 (3)
 (15)
 (4)
 (1)
/ North Australia (16)
 (2)
 (2)
 (6)
 (2)
 (3)
 (4)

References

Oceania Junior Athletics Championships
Athletics in the Cook Islands
Oceania Junior Athletics Championships
Oceania Junior Athletics Championships
International sports competitions hosted by the Cook Islands